Josemania is a genus of flowering plant in the family Bromeliaceae, first described in 2016.

Taxonomy
, the genus is accepted by the Encyclopedia of Bromeliads, while Plants of the World Online sinks it into Cipuropsis. Five species are accepted by the Encyclopedia of Bromeliads:
Josemania asplundii (L.B.Sm.) W.Till & Barfuss, syn. Cipuropsis asplundii (L.B.Sm.) Christenh. & Byng
Josemania delicatula (L.B.Sm.) W.Till & Barfuss, syn. Cipuropsis delicatula (L.B.Sm.) Christenh. & Byng
Josemania pinnata (Mez & Sodiro) W.Till & Barfuss, syn. Cipuropsis pinnata (Mez & Sodiro) Christenh. & Byng
Josemania singularis (Mez & Wercklé) W.Till & Barfuss, syn. Cipuropsis singularis (Mez & Wercklé) Christenh. & Byng
Josemania truncata (L.B.Sm.) W.Till & Barfuss, syn. Cipuropsis truncata (L.B.Sm.) Christenh. & Byng

References

Tillandsioideae